Incisa Scapaccino (from 1863 to 1928 Incisa Belbo) is a comune (municipality) in the Province of Asti in the Italian region Piedmont, located about  southeast of Turin and about  southeast of Asti.

Incisa Scapaccino borders the following municipalities: Bergamasco, Castelnuovo Belbo, Cortiglione, Masio, Nizza Monferrato, Oviglio, and Vaglio Serra.

The town was the seat of an Aleramic marquisate from 1161  to 1548.

Twin towns — sister cities
Incisa Scapaccino is twinned with:

  Saint-Just-Chaleyssin, France (1972)

References

External links
 Official website

Cities and towns in Piedmont